The Filmfare Best Director Award is one of the main awards presented given by the annual Filmfare Awards to recognise directors working in Hindi cinema. It was first presented in 1954 in the inaugural year.

Superlatives

Bimal Roy has the record of winning most awards (7) and the distinction of winning the award thrice in a row, on 2 separate occasions (1954–1956 and 1959–1961). He also won the award whenever he was nominated (7/7). Yash Chopra, Raj Kapoor and Sanjay Leela Bhansali have received the award 4 times each. Yash Chopra received 12 nominations, while Raj Kapoor and Sanjay Leela Bhansali have received 6 nominations each. Mahesh Bhatt was nominated thrice in a row (1984–1986). However, he hasn't received any award even after having been nominated 6 times. Also, no director has ever won if one has been nominated twice in the same year – Gulzar in 1974 (for Achanak and Koshish), Basu Chatterjee in 1977 (for Chhoti Si Baat and Chitchor) and Hrishikesh Mukherjee in 1980 (for Gol Maal and Jurmana).

Sai Paranjpye was the first of 4 women to have won this award, the second being Zoya Akhtar, the third being Ashwiny Iyer Tiwari, and the fourth being Meghna Gulzar. Sai Paranjpye won it for Sparsh in 1985. Paranjpye had earlier been nominated for Chashme Buddoor in 1982. Zoya Akhtar won it for Zindagi Na Milegi Dobara in 2012. Ashwiny Iyer Tiwari won it for Bareilly Ki Barfi in 2018 and Meghna Gulzar won it in for Raazi in 2019, after previously being nominated in 2016 for Talvar. Akhtar won the award again for Gully Boy in 2020, thus becoming the only woman to win the award twice. Other women directors to have been nominated are Mira Nair for Salaam Bombay! in 1990, Farah Khan for Main Hoon Na in 2005 and for Om Shanti Om in 2008, and Gauri Shinde for English Vinglish in 2013.

Rajkumar Santoshi remains the only director to have won the award for his first two films – for Ghayal in 1991 and for Damini in 1994.

Nitesh Tiwari and Ashwiny Iyer Tiwari are the only married couple to win the award. Additionally, they won the award in consecutive years – Nitesh Tiwari won the award for Dangal in 2017 and Ashwiny Iyer Tiwari won the award for Bareilly Ki Barfi in 2018.

Only once have two siblings been nominated in the same year; Zoya Akhtar for Zindagi Na Milegi Dobara and Farhan Akhtar for Don 2 in 2012.

Multiple nominations
The following Directors have received multiple Best Director nominations. The list is sorted by the number of total awards (with the number of total nominations listed in parentheses).

  7  : Bimal Roy (7)
 4 : Yash Chopra (12)
 4 : Sanjay Leela Bhansali (7)
 4 : Raj Kapoor (6)
 2 : Rakesh Roshan (5)
 2 : Rajkumar Santoshi (5)
 2 : Karan Johar (5)
 2 : Ashutosh Gowariker (3)
 2 : Manoj Kumar (3)
 2 : Zoya Akhtar (2)
 2 : Govind Nihalani (2)
 2 : Rakeysh Omprakash Mehra (2)
 1 : Subhash Ghai (6)
 1 : Gulzar (6)
 1 : B. R. Chopra (5)
 1 : Rajkumar Hirani (5)
 1 : Mansoor Khan (4)
 1 : Shyam Benegal (3)
 1 : Basu Chatterjee (3)
 1 : Aditya Chopra (3)
 1 : Vidhu Vinod Chopra (3)
 1 : Sohanlal Kanwar (3)
 1 : Mukul Anand (2)
 1 : Sooraj Barjatya (2)
 1 : J. P. Dutta (2)
 1 : Shekhar Kapur (2)
 1 : Mehboob Khan (2)
 1 : Sai Paranjpye (2)
 1 : Ramanand Sagar (2)
 1 : Asit Sen (2)
 1 : V. Shantaram (2) 
 1 : Meghna Gulzar (2)
 1 : Nitesh Tiwari (2)
 1 : Kunal Kohli (1)
 1 : Sujoy Ghosh (1)
 1 : Aamir Khan (1)
 1 : Vikas Bahl (1)
 1 : Om Raut (1)
 1 : Vijay Anand (1)
 1 : Abrar Alvi (1)
 1 : Satyajit Ray (1)
 1 : Muzaffar Ali (1)
 0 : Mahesh Bhatt (6) 
 0 : Hrishikesh Mukherjee (5) 
 0 : Ram Gopal Varma (5)
 0 : Shoojit Sircar (4)
 0 : Ramesh Sippy (3) 
 0 : Imtiaz Ali (3) 
 0 : Anurag Kashyap (3) 
 0 : Anurag Basu (3) 
 0 : Vishal Bhardwaj (3) 
 0 : Farhan Akhtar (3)
 0 : Shakti Samanta (3) 
 0 : Prakash Mehra (2) 
 0 : Indra Kumar (2) 
 0 : Rajiv Rai (2) 
 0 : Dharmesh Darshan (2)
 0 : Abbas–Mustan (2) 
 0 : Abhishek Kapoor (2)
 0 : Ayan Mukerji (2) 
 0 : Aanand L. Rai (2) 
 0 : Farah Khan (2) 
 0 : Kabir Khan (2) 
 0 : Madhur Bhandarkar (2) 
 0 : Sriram Raghavan (2) 
 0 : L. V. Prasad (2) 
 0 : Raj Khosla (2) 
 0 : David Dhawan (2) 
 0 : Vikram Bhatt (2)
 0 : Rahul Rawail (2)

Winner and nominees
In the list below, the winner of the award for each year is shown first, followed by the other nominees. The films are listed by the years when the award was presented. The announcing of nominations became regular after 1959.

1950s
 1954 Bimal Roy – Do Bigha Zamin
 1955 Bimal Roy – Parineeta
 1956 Bimal Roy – Biraj Bahu
 1957 V. Shantaram – Jhanak Jhanak Payal Baaje
 1958 Mehboob Khan – Mother India
 1959 Bimal Roy – Madhumati
 B. R. Chopra – Sadhna
 Mahesh Kaul – Talaaq

1960s
 1960 Bimal Roy – Sujata
 L. V. Prasad – Chhoti Bahen
 V. Shantaram – Navrang
 1961 Bimal Roy – Parakh
 K. Asif – Mughal-e-Azam
 Kishore Sahu – Dil Apna Aur Preet Parai
 1962 B. R. Chopra – Kanoon
 Nitin Bose – Gunga Jumna
 Radhu Karmakar – Jis Desh Men Ganga Behti Hai
 1963 Abrar Alvi – Sahib Bibi Aur Ghulam
 Biren Nag – Bees Saal Baad
 Mehboob Khan – Son of India
 1964 Bimal Roy – Bandini
 B. R. Chopra – Gumrah
 C. V. Sridhar – Dil Ek Mandir
 1965 Raj Kapoor – Sangam
 Khwaja Ahmad Abbas – Shehar Aur Sapna
 Satyen Bose – Dosti
 1966 Yash Chopra – Waqt
 Chetan Anand – Haqeeqat
 Ramanand Sagar – Arzoo
 1967 Vijay Anand – Guide
 Asit Sen – Mamta
 Hrishikesh Mukherjee – Anupama
 1968 Manoj Kumar – Upkar
 A. Bhimsingh – Mehrban
 A. Subba Rao – Milan
 1969 Ramanand Sagar – Ankhen
 Bhappi Soni – Brahmachari
 Ram Maheshwari – Neel Kamal

1970s
 1970 Yash Chopra – Ittefaq
 L. V. Prasad – Jeene Ki Raah
 Shakti Samanta – Aradhana
 1971 Asit Sen – Safar
 Raj Khosla – Do Raaste
 Sohanlal Kanwar – Pehchan
 1972 Raj Kapoor – Mera Naam Joker
 Hrishikesh Mukherjee – Anand
 Shakti Samanta – Kati Patang
 1973 Sohanlal Kanwar – Be-Imaan
 Kamal Amrohi – Pakeezah
 Manoj Kumar – Shor
 1974 Yash Chopra – Daag
 Gulzar – Achanak
 Gulzar – Koshish
 Raj Kapoor – Bobby
 Rajendra Bhatia – Aaj Ki Taaza Khabar
 1975 Manoj Kumar – Roti Kapda Aur Makaan
 Anil Ganguly – Kora Kagaz
 Basu Bhattacharya – Avishkaar
 M. S. Sathyu – Garm Hava
 Shyam Benegal – Ankur
 1976 Yash Chopra – Deewaar
 Gulzar – Aandhi
 Ramesh Sippy – Sholay
 Shakti Samanta – Amanush
 Sohanlal Kanwar – Sanyasi
 1977 Gulzar – Mausam
 Basu Chatterjee – Chhoti Si Baat
 Basu Chatterjee – Chitchor
 Rajkumar Kohli – Nagin
 Yash Chopra – Kabhi Kabhie
 1978 Basu Chatterjee – Swami
 Asrani – Chala Murari Hero Banne
 Bhimsain – Gharaonda
 Gulzar – Kinara
 Manmohan Desai – Amar Akbar Anthony
 1979 Satyajit Ray – Shatranj Ke Khilari
 Prakash Mehra – Muqaddar Ka Sikandar
 Raj Kapoor – Satyam Shivam Sundaram
Raj Khosla – Main Tulsi Tere Aangan Ki
 Yash Chopra – Trishul

1980s
 1980 Shyam Benegal – Junoon
Hrishikesh Mukherjee – Gol Maal
 Hrishikesh Mukherjee – Jurmana
Manmohan Krishna – Noorie
Yash Chopra – Kaala Patthar
 1981 Govind Nihalani – Aakrosh
 B. R. Chopra – Insaaf Ka Tarazu
 Esmayeel Shroff – Thodisi Bewafaii
 Hrishikesh Mukherjee – Khubsoorat
 J. Om Prakash – Aasha
 1982 Muzaffar Ali – Umrao Jaan
 K. Balachander – Ek Duuje Ke Liye
 Rabindra Dharamraj – Chakra
 Ramesh Talwar – Baseraa
 Sai Paranjpye – Chashme Buddoor
 Shyam Benegal – Kalyug
 1983 Raj Kapoor – Prem Rog
 B. R. Chopra – Nikaah
 Ramesh Sippy – Shakti
 Sagar Sarhadi – Bazaar
 Subhash Ghai – Vidhaata
 1984 Govind Nihalani – Ardh Satya
 Mahesh Bhatt – Arth
 Mohan Kumar – Avtaar
 Rahul Rawail – Betaab
 Shekhar Kapur – Masoom
 1985 Sai Paranjpye – Sparsh
 Kundan Shah – Jaane Bhi Do Yaaro
 Mahesh Bhatt – Saaransh
 Prakash Mehra – Sharaabi
 Ravi Chopra – Aaj Ki Awaaz
 1986 Raj Kapoor – Ram Teri Ganga Maili
 Mahesh Bhatt – Janam
 Rahul Rawail – Arjun
 Ramesh Sippy – Saagar
 1987 No Award
 1988 No Award
 1989 Mansoor Khan – Qayamat Se Qayamat Tak
 N. Chandra – Tezaab
 Rakesh Roshan – Khoon Bhari Maang

1990s
 1990 Vidhu Vinod Chopra – Parinda
 Mira Nair – Salaam Bombay!
 Sooraj Barjatya – Maine Pyar Kiya
 Subhash Ghai – Ram Lakhan
 Yash Chopra – Chandni
 1991 Rajkumar Santoshi – Ghayal
 Mahesh Bhatt – Aashiqui
 Mukul Anand – Agneepath
 Ravi Raja Pinisetty – Pratibandh
 1992 Subhash Ghai – Saudagar
 Lawrence D'Souza – Saajan
 Mahesh Bhatt – Dil Hai Ke Manta Nahin
 Randhir Kapoor – Henna
 Yash Chopra – Lamhe
 1993 Mukul S. Anand – Khuda Gawah
 Indra Kumar – Beta
 Mansoor Khan – Jo Jeeta Wohi Sikandar
 1994 Rajkumar Santoshi – Damini
 David Dhawan – Aankhen
 Mahesh Bhatt – Hum Hain Rahi Pyar Ke
 Subhash Ghai – Khalnayak
 Yash Chopra – Darr
 1995 Sooraj Barjatya – Hum Aapke Hain Koun..!
 Mehul Kumar – Krantiveer
 Rajiv Rai – Mohra
 Rajkumar Santoshi – Andaz Apna Apna
 Vidhu Vinod Chopra – 1942: A Love Story
 1996 Aditya Chopra – Dilwale Dulhania Le Jayenge
 Indra Kumar – Raja
 Mansoor Khan – Akele Hum Akele Tum
 Rakesh Roshan – Karan Arjun
 Ram Gopal Varma – Rangeela
 1997 Shekhar Kapur – Bandit Queen
 Dharmesh Darshan – Raja Hindustani
 Gulzar – Maachis
 Partho Ghosh – Agni Sakshi
 Rajkumar Santoshi – Ghatak
 1998 J. P. Dutta – Border
 Priyadarshan – Virasat
 Rajiv Rai – Gupt
 Subhash Ghai – Pardes
 Yash Chopra – Dil To Pagal Hai
 1999 Karan Johar – Kuch Kuch Hota Hai
 Abbas–Mustan – Soldier
 Ram Gopal Varma – Satya
 Sohail Khan – Pyaar Kiya To Darna Kya
 Vikram Bhatt – Ghulam

2000s
 2000 Sanjay Leela Bhansali – Hum Dil De Chuke Sanam
 David Dhawan – Biwi No.1
 John Matthew Matthan – Sarfarosh
 Mahesh Manjrekar – Vaastav
 Subhash Ghai – Taal
 2001 Rakesh Roshan – Kaho Naa... Pyaar Hai
 Aditya Chopra – Mohabbatein
 Dharmesh Darshan – Dhadkan
 Mansoor Khan – Josh
 Vidhu Vinod Chopra – Mission Kashmir
 2002 Ashutosh Gowariker – Lagaan
 Anil Sharma – Gadar: Ek Prem Katha
 Farhan Akhtar – Dil Chahta Hai
 Karan Johar – Kabhi Khushi Kabhie Gham...
 Santosh Sivan – Asoka
 2003 Sanjay Leela Bhansali – Devdas
 Abbas–Mustan – Humraaz
 Ram Gopal Varma – Company
 Sanjay Gupta – Kaante
 Vikram Bhatt – Raaz
 2004 Rakesh Roshan – Koi... Mil Gaya
 J. P. Dutta – LOC: Kargil
 Nikhil Advani – Kal Ho Naa Ho
 Rajkumar Hirani – Munna Bhai M.B.B.S.
 Ram Gopal Varma – Bhoot
 Satish Kaushik – Tere Naam
 2005 Kunal Kohli – Hum Tum
 Ashutosh Gowariker – Swades
 Farah Khan – Main Hoon Na
 Farhan Akhtar – Lakshya
 Rajkumar Santoshi – Khakee
 Yash Chopra – Veer-Zaara
 2006 Sanjay Leela Bhansali – Black
 Madhur Bhandarkar – Page 3
 Nagesh Kukunoor – Iqbal
 Pradeep Sarkar – Parineeta
 Ram Gopal Varma – Sarkar
 2007 Rakeysh Omprakash Mehra – Rang De Basanti
 Karan Johar – Kabhi Alvida Naa Kehna
 Rajkumar Hirani – Lage Raho Munna Bhai
 Rakesh Roshan – Krrish
 Sanjay Gadhvi – Dhoom 2
 Vishal Bhardwaj – Omkara
 2008 Aamir Khan – Taare Zameen Par
 Anurag Basu – Life in a... Metro
 Farah Khan – Om Shanti Om
 Imtiaz Ali – Jab We Met
 Mani Ratnam – Guru
 Shimit Amin – Chak De! India
 2009 Ashutosh Gowariker – Jodhaa Akbar
 A. R. Murugadoss – Ghajini
 Abhishek Kapoor – Rock On!!
 Aditya Chopra – Rab Ne Bana Di Jodi
 Madhur Bhandarkar – Fashion
 Neeraj Pandey – A Wednesday!

2010s
 2010 Rajkumar Hirani – 3 Idiots
 Anurag Kashyap – Dev.D
 Ayan Mukerji – Wake Up Sid
 Imtiaz Ali – Love Aaj Kal
 R. Balki – Paa
 Vishal Bhardwaj – Kaminey
 2011 Karan Johar – My Name Is Khan
 Abhinav Kashyap – Dabangg
 Manish Sharma – Band Baaja Baaraat
 Sanjay Leela Bhansali – Guzaarish
 Vikramaditya Motwane – Udaan
 2012 Zoya Akhtar – Zindagi Na Milegi Dobara
 Abhinay Deo – Delhi Belly
 Farhan Akhtar – Don 2
 Imtiaz Ali – Rockstar
 Milan Luthria – The Dirty Picture
 Raj Kumar Gupta – No One Killed Jessica
 2013 Sujoy Ghosh – Kahaani
 Anurag Basu – Barfi!
 Anurag Kashyap – Gangs of Wasseypur
 Gauri Shinde – English Vinglish
 Shoojit Sircar – Vicky Donor
 2014 Rakeysh Omprakash Mehra – Bhaag Milkha Bhaag
 Abhishek Kapoor – Kai Po Che!
 Anand L. Rai – Raanjhanaa
 Ayan Mukerji – Yeh Jawaani Hai Deewani
 Rohit Shetty – Chennai Express
 Sanjay Leela Bhansali – Goliyon Ki Raasleela Ram-Leela
 2015 Vikas Bahl – Queen
 Abhishek Varman – 2 States
 Anurag Kashyap – Ugly
 Rajkumar Hirani – PK
 Vishal Bhardwaj – Haider
 2016 Sanjay Leela Bhansali – Bajirao Mastani
 Anand L. Rai – Tanu Weds Manu Returns
 Kabir Khan – Bajrangi Bhaijaan
 Meghna Gulzar – Talvar
 Shoojit Sircar – Piku
 Sriram Raghavan – Badlapur
 2017 Nitesh Tiwari – Dangal
Abhishek Chaubey – Udta Punjab
Ali Abbas Zafar – Sultan
Karan Johar – Ae Dil Hai Mushkil
Ram Madhvani – Neerja
Shakun Batra – Kapoor & Sons
 2018 Ashwiny Iyer Tiwari – Bareilly Ki Barfi
 Advait Chandan – Secret Superstar
Saket Chaudhary – Hindi Medium
Shashank Khaitan – Badrinath Ki Dulhania
Shree Narayan Singh – Toilet: Ek Prem Katha
 2019 Meghna Gulzar – Raazi 
Amar Kaushik – Stree
Amit Sharma – Badhaai Ho
Rajkumar Hirani – Sanju
Sanjay Leela Bhansali – Padmaavat
Sriram Raghavan – Andhadhun

2020s
 2020 Zoya Akhtar – Gully Boy
Aditya Dhar – Uri: The Surgical Strike
 Jagan Shakti – Mission Mangal
 Nitesh Tiwari – Chhichhore
 Siddharth Anand – War
 2021 Om Raut – Tanhaji
Anubhav Sinha – Thappad
Anurag Basu – Ludo
Sharan Sharma – Gunjan Saxena: The Kargil Girl
Shoojit Sircar – Gulabo Sitabo
 2022 Vishnuvardhan – Shershah
 Akarsh Khurana – Rashmi Rocket
 Kabir Khan – 83
 Seema Pahwa – Ramprasad Ki Tehrvi
 Shoojit Sircar – Sardar Udham

See also
 Filmfare Awards
 Bollywood
 Cinema of India

External links
Filmfare Awards Best Director

Director
Awards for best director
Lists of Indian film directors